Teun is a Dutch masculine given name. It is a short form of Teunis, itself a derivative of Antonius (Anthony). It is also considered a diminutive form of Antonius, Anton, Antoon, Anthonis, Anthoon, Antonie, and Antonis used in Belgium, Netherlands, Suriname, South Africa, Namibia, and Indonesia. As a birth name it has risen in popularity since the 1980s. People with the name include:

 Teun Beijnen (1899–1949), Dutch rower, Olympic competitor in 1924 and 1928 Summer Olympics
 Teun Buijs (born 1960), Dutch volleyball player
 Teun van Dijck (born 1963), Dutch politician and former management consultant, restaurateur and civil servant
 Teun A. van Dijk (born 1943), scholar in text linguistics, discourse analysis and Critical Discourse Analysis
 Teun Eikelboom (born 1940), Dutch composer, musician and writer known by the pseudonym Tonny Eyk
  (born 1947), Dutch photographer
  (1927–2014), Dutch Old Catholic bishop
 Teun Jacob (1927–2009), Dutch wall painter and sculptor who lived and worked in Rotterdam
 Teun van de Keuken  (born 1971), Dutch television and radio producer
 Teun Kloek (born 1934), Dutch economist, Emeritus Professor of Econometrics at the Erasmus Universiteit Rotterdam
 Teun Koolhaas (1940–2007), Dutch architect and urban planner
 Teun Luijkx (born 1986), Dutch actor
 Teun Mulder (born 1981), Dutch track cyclist
 Teun de Nooijer (born 1976), field hockey player from the Netherlands who twice became Olympic champion
 Teun Sprong (1889–1971), Dutch long-distance runner
 Teun Struycken (1906–1977), Dutch politician and a member of the Catholic People's Party
 Teun Tolman (1924–2007), Dutch politician
 Teun van Vliet (born 1962), retired Dutch road bicycle racer
 Teun Voeten (born 1961), international photojournalist specializing in war and conflicts
Theun
 Theun de Vries (1907–2005), Dutch writer and poet

See also 
 Teun Island in the Barat Daya Islands, a group of islands in the Maluku province of Indonesia
 Teun language or Te'un language (Teun), an Austronesian language originally spoken on Teun Island in Maluku, Indonesia
 Little Tony (film) (Dutch: Kleine Teun), a 1998 Dutch comedy film drama

References 

Dutch masculine given names

de:Teun